Vanikoroidea is a superfamily of sea snails, marine gastropod molluscs  in the clade Littorinimorpha. The superfamily Eulimoidea is a synonym of Vanikoroidea.

Families
Families within the superfamily Vanikoroidea include:
Family Eulimidae Philippi, 1853 
Family Haloceratidae Warén & Bouchet, 1991 
Family Hipponicidae Troschel, 1861 
Family Vanikoridae Gray, 1840

References

 
Taxa named by John Edward Gray